David Hamilton (born April 9, 1949) served as mayor of the city of Thunder Bay, Ontario from 1992 to 1997, and later served as an  administrator in three American county governments.

Hamilton was born in Fort William, Ontario to James Murray Hamilton from Paris, Ontario and Martha Alice James from Kansas City, Missouri, who married in 1944. He attended the Fort William Collegiate Institute.

Married Linda in 1970. 3 children.

References 

Mayors of Thunder Bay
1950s births
Living people